North Salinas High School is a public high school established in Salinas, California.  It is one of five primary high schools of the Salinas Union High School District.  The school was founded in 1959 as the second high school in the system to relieve overcrowding at the original high school in Salinas, Salinas High School.

Students at North Salinas usually come from Harden Middle School, Washington Middle School, and Gavilan View Middle School.

Notable alumni
Dustin Lance Black, screenwriter, 2008 Academy Award for Milk
Alvin Harrison, twin of Calvin, 1996 gold medal in Olympic 4x400 relay; 2000 silver medal in 400 metres, 2000 gold medal in 4x400 relay, later disqualified due to drug violation by a teammate; afterward competed for the Dominican Republic
Calvin Harrison, twin of Alvin, national high school record 400m, 2000 gold medal in Olympic 4x400 relay, later disqualified due to drug violation by a teammate
Del Rodgers, of San Francisco 49ers; Super Bowl champions
Carl Nicks, New Orleans Saints Pro Bowl guard and Super Bowl XLIV champion
Ramiro Corrales, Major League Soccer player
Monica Abbott, pro softball player, participated in 2008 Beijing Olympics with Team USA
Bryiana Noelle, Playboy Playmate, Miss September 2013
Kassim Osgood, San Diego Chargers wide receiver
Anthony Toney, of Philadelphia Eagles

References

High schools in Monterey County, California
Public high schools in California
1959 establishments in California